The men's high jump event at the 2011 Summer Universiade was held on 16–18 August.

Medalists

Results

Qualification
Qualification: 2.23 m (Q) or at least 12 best (q) qualified for the final.

Final

References
Qualification Group A results
Qualification Group B results
Final results

High
2011